Zhirkov (or Jerkof) (from жир meaning fat) is a Russian masculine surname, its feminine counterpart is Zhirkova. Notable people with the surname include:

Yuri Zhirkov (born 1983), Russian football player, brother of Nikolai

Russian-language surnames